= Rafah Elementary Co-Ed B School =

School in Rafah, Gaza Strip, Palestine

Coordinates: 31.281389°N 34.255706°E

Rafah Elementary Co-Ed “B” School (مدرسة رفح الابتدائية كو-إد بي) is a school in Rafah, Gaza Strip, Palestine, run by the United Nations Relief and Works Agency for Palestine Refugees (UNRWA). It stands 800 meters from the border with Israel and has been damaged by weapons fire on several occasions.

On January 31, 2005, pupil Noran Iyad Deeb was killed by a bullet said by to have been fired from the area of the Israeli-controlled border. A second pupil was injured in the hand.
